The Aya Group of Companies, commonly referred to as the Aya Group, is a business conglomerate based in Uganda.

Location
With headquarters at 62 Bombo Road, Kawempe, in northern Kampala, Uganda's largest city, the group's business activities extend to the countries of Burundi, the Democratic Republic of the Congo, Kenya, Rwanda, Tanzania, Uganda, and South Sudan. Aya Group also maintains subsidiaries in Dubai, United Arab Emirates and in New York City. The geographical coordinates of the Aya Group headquarters are 0°22'39.0"N, 32°33'17.0"E (Latitude:0.377500; Longitude:32.554725).

Overview
, the Aya Group was a fast-growing conglomerate. It is one of the largest corporate employers in Uganda, with over 5,000 people under payroll. With a total asset base in excess of US$400 million, the group is involved in the following business lines, among others: food processing, investments, transportation, real estate development, hospitality, mining, and merchandising.

The 300-room The Pearl of Africa Hotel Kampala, was constructed by Aya Investments, a subsidiary of the group. It sits on Nakasero Hill in central Kampala. The hotel  cost over US$150 million to build. It was expected to be Uganda's third 5-star hotel, next to the Kampala Serena Hotel, which was commissioned in 2006, and the Kampala Intercontinental Hotel, currently under construction.  Because the majority of construction materials are sourced locally, the construction of this hotel has contributed enormously to Uganda's economy.

Fifi Transport Limited, another group subsidiary, owns a fleet of Mercedes Benz trucks.

Aya Foundation
The Aya Foundation is a non-profit charitable organization that was set up on the urging Mohammed Hamid, the Group Chairman. The foundation assists organizations that cater for needy children. One area that the foundation pays special attention to is the provision of pediatric medications.

Subsidiary companies
The Aya Group includes but is not limited to the following companies:

 Aya Bakery Limited - Kampala, Uganda
 Aya Biscuits Limited - Kampala, Uganda
 Aya Foundation Limited - Kampala, Uganda - non-profit charity, helping needy children
 Aya Investments Limited - Kampala Uganda - Owners of Kampala Hilton Hotel - One of the only three 5-star hotels in Uganda
 Aya Mills Limited - Kampala, Uganda
 Fifi Transport Limited - Kampala, Uganda
 Pan Afric Commodities Limited - Kampala, Uganda
 Aya Mining Limited - Kampala, Uganda
 Aya Mohammed Trade Plc. - Dubai, United Arab Emirates
 Aya Property Developers Inc. - New York City

See also
 List of tallest buildings in Kampala
 List of wealthiest people in Uganda
 List of conglomerates in Uganda
 Kawempe Division
 Kampala Capital City Authority

References

External links
 Group Website

Conglomerate companies of Uganda
Companies based in Kampala
Kawempe Division